The 2016 Bristol City Council election took place on Thursday 5 May 2016, alongside nationwide local elections. Following a boundary review, the number of wards in the city was reduced to 34, with each electing one, two or three Councillors. The overall number of Councillors remained 70, with all seats up for election at the same time. Elections would then be held every 4 years.

The Conservatives, Labour and the Liberal Democrats contested all 70 seats. The Green Party stood 59 candidates, TUSC 18, UKIP 10 and the Wessex Regionalists 1. There were also 8 Independent candidates.

Voters in the city were also voting in the 2016 Bristol Mayoral Election and the election for Avon and Somerset's Police and Crime Commissioner. Turnout across the city was high, with many wards recording over 50% turnout, and none recording less than 25%. Labour won a number of new seats and gained overall control of the council, whilst all other parties lost seats. UKIP lost their only Councillor.

This result had the following consequences for the total number of seats on the council after the elections:

Council Composition
Prior to the election the composition of the council was:

After the election the composition of the council was:

Lib Dem - Liberal Democrats
U - UK Independence Party (UKIP)

Ward results

Ashley

Avonmouth & Lawrence Weston

Bedminster

Bishopston & Ashley Down

Bishopsworth

Brislington East

Brislington West

Central

Clifton

Clifton Down

*On 22 April 2016, it was announced that Satnam Singh had been suspended from the Labour Party for failing to disclose prior convictions for selling illegal tobacco and drugs. As the nominations process had already been completed, it was too late for Labour to nominate a new candidate or withdraw Mr Singh from the ballot.

Cotham

Easton

Eastville

Filwood

Frome Vale

Hartcliffe & Withywood

Henbury & Brentry

Hengrove & Whitchurch Park

Hillfields

Horfield

Hotwells & Harbourside

Knowle

Lawrence Hill

Lockleaze

Redland

Southmead

Southville

St George Central

St George Troopers Hill

St George West

Stockwood

Stoke Bishop

Westbury-on-Trym & Henleaze

Windmill Hill

References

2016 English local elections
2016
2010s in Bristol